The 10th Parliament of Singapore was a meeting of the Parliament of Singapore. The first session commenced on 25 March 2002 and was prorogued on the 1 December 2004. The second session begun from 12 January 2005 and was dissolved on 20 April 2006. The membership was set by the 2001 Singapore General Election on 3 November 2001, and it has been only changed due to Lee Hsien Loong being elected as the Prime Minister in Singapore in 2004.

The 10th Parliament is controlled by a People's Action Party majority, led by Prime Minister Goh Chok Tong and members of the cabinet, which assumed power on 3 November 2001, and later led by Prime Minister Lee Hsien Loong, who assumed power on 12 August 2004. The Opposition is led by the Mr Chiam See Tong of the Singapore Democratic Alliance. The Speaker of the Parliament of Singapore is Abdullah bin Tarmugi, of the People's Action Party. He was elected as the Speaker of the House for the 10th Parliament on 25 March 2002.

Officeholders

Speakers 
Speaker: Abdullah Tarmugi (PAP)
Deputy Speaker:
Chew Heng Ching (PAP), from 1 April 2002
Lim Hwee Hua (PAP), from 1 April 2002 until 11 August 2004
S. Iswaran (PAP), from 1 September 2004

Leaders
Prime Minister:
Goh Chok Tong (PAP), until 12 August 2004
Lee Hsien Loong (PAP), from 12 August 2004
Leader of the Opposition: Chiam See Tong (SDA)

House Leaders
Leader of the House: Wong Kan Seng (PAP)
Deputy Leader of the House: Mah Bow Tan (PAP), from 1 April 2002

Whips
Party Whip of the People's Action Party: Lee Boon Yang
Deputy Party Whip of the People's Action Party:'''
Lim Swee Say
Inderjit Singh

Composition

Members

Elected Members of Parliament

Non-constituency Members of Parliament

Nominated Members of Parliament 

 Fang Ai Lian, from 2 July 2002 until 1 January 2005
 Gan See Khem, from 2 July 2002 until 1 January 2005
 Olivia Lum, from 2 July 2002 until 1 January 2005
 Braema Mathiaparanam, from 2 July 2002 until 1 January 2005
 Chandra Mohan K. Nair, from 2 July 2002 until 1 January 2005
 A. Nithiah Nandan, from 2 July 2002 until 1 January 2005
 Ng Ser Miang, from 2 July 2002 until 1 January 2005
 Ngiam Tee Liang, from 2 July 2002 until 1 January 2005

 Alexander Chan Meng Wah, from 2 January 2005
 Geh Min, from 2 January 2005

 Lawrence Leow Chin Hin, from 2 January 2005
 Loo Choon Yong, from 2 January 2005
 Eunice Olsen, from 2 January 2005
 Ong Soh Khim, from 2 January 2005
 Ivan Png, from 2 January 2005
 Tan Sze Wee, from 2 January 2005
 Teo Yock Ngee, from 2 January 2005

References

Parliament of Singapore